Hans Schemm (6 October 1891 – 5 March 1935) was an educator who became a prominent Nazi Party official. He served as Gauleiter of Gau Bayreuth and Bavarian State Minister for Education and Culture until his death in an airplane accident.

Early life
Schemm, whose parents ran a shoemaker's shop, was born in Bayreuth. He attended volksschule for five years and then a teacher training preparatory school. From 1908 to 1910 he attended the Royal Bavarian Teachers' Seminar, a teachers' college in Altdorf bei Nürnberg. He taught school beginning in 1910, first in Wülfersreuth, then as of 1911 in Neufang. In 1915 he got married; in 1917 a son was born. When the First World War broke out, Schemm was drafted and served as a medical attendant at a military epidemic hospital in Bayreuth. There he became infected with tuberculosis and, consequently, was discharged from military service on 26 August 1916. He returned to his teaching job in Neufang. In 1919 he was a member of the Freikorps Bayreuth, which took part in the suppression of the short-lived Bavarian Soviet Republic in Munich. On the basis of his background in bio-chemistry, Schemm became head of a bacteriological-chemical laboratory (Sanitorium Hubertusbad) in Thale. After it closed in 1921 for financial reasons, Schemm returned to the classroom as a volkschule teacher at the Altstadtschule ("Old Town School") in Bayreuth, which after his death was named the Hans-Schemm-Schule.

Nazi Party career
Schemm had joined the Nazi Party in 1922. On 30 September, 1923 he first met Adolf Hitler. When the Party was banned in the wake of the Beer Hall Putsch, Schemm, with Hitler’s blessing, became First  Assessor in the Bayreuth Völkischer Bund in 1924 and, when it disbanded, joined the National Socialist Freedom Movement. When the Nazi Party was re-established in 1925, Schemm immediately rejoined it on 27 February (membership number 29,313) and organized the Bayreuth Ortsgruppe (Local Group) becoming its Ortsgruppenleiter, a post he would retain until his death.In May 1927 he advanced to Bezirksleiter (District Leader) in Upper Franconia. A gifter speaker, he became an effective propagandist and served as a Reichsredner (national orator).  

On 20 May 1928, Schemm was elected a member of the Bavarian Landtag, serving until September 1930. On 1 October 1928 when Julius Streicher’s large Gau of Northern Bavaria (Nordbayern) was broken up, Schemm became the Gauleiter of the newly established Gau of Upper Franconia (Oberfranken). On 24 November 1928, Schemm co-founded the National Socialist Teachers League (NSLB) in Hof and was elected its leader ("Reichswalter") on 21 April 1929. 

Schemm also took on the role of Nazi Party publicist. Between 1928 and 1929 he was the editor of several Nazi newspapers (Der Streiter, Weckruf and Nationale Zeitung). In August 1929, Schemm founded his own newspaper, the Nationalsozialistische Lehrerzeitung ("National Socialist Teachers' Newspaper"), that became the journalistic organ of the NSLB. On 1 October 1930 came the first edition of the weekly newspaper Kampf für deutsche Freiheit und Kultur ("Struggle for German Freedom and Culture"), which was published by Schemm, and whose circulation rose from 3,000 in the beginning to 20,000 by 1932. In July 1931, Schemm founded the Bayreuth National Socialist Cultural Publishing House (Nationalsozialistischer Kulturverlag Bayreuth), which beginning on 1 October 1932 published the daily newspaper Das Fränkische Volk (circulation: 10,000).

On 8 December 1929 Schemm became a member of the Bayreuth Stadrat (City Council) and chairman of its Nazi faction. In September 1930, he was elected a member of the German national parliament, the Reichstag, from electoral constituency 26, Franconia. On 19 January 1933, the Gau of Upper Franconia, led by Schemm, was merged with the Gau of Lower Bavaria-Upper Palatinate  (Niederbayern-Oberpfalz) to form the Gau Bavarian Eastern March. Schemm became the Gauleiter of the enlarged Gau. 

On 16 March 1933, the Reichsstatthalter (Reich Governor) of Bavaria, Franz Ritter von Epp, appointed Schemm as the Acting State Minister for Education  and Culture. On 12 April he was made permanent minister and "Leader of Cultural and Educational Affairs of Bavaria" in the cabinet of Minister-President Ludwig Siebert. At the same time, he officially left school service. In October 1933, Schemm became a member of the Academy for German Law. He was a holder of the Golden Party Badge and was also granted honorary citizenship of Bayreuth. On 17 November 1933, he became head of the Office for the NSLB within the leadership of the Nazi Party. On 1 April 1934, Schemm was named head (Hauptamtsleiter) of the Main Office for Education at the Brown House, the national headquarters of the NSDAP.

Schemm has been described as "perhaps the most skilled and dynamic of Franconia's Nazi leaders." However, his political positions were clearly antidemocratic, anti-Semitic and anti-Communist, as can be seen in some of his quotations:

"We are not objective – we are German!" 
" ... that a Jew should dangle from every lamppost."

In April 1933, when Schemm arrived in Passau to attend the laying of the corner stone for the Hall of the Nibelungs, he addressed the masses. Passau honored Schemm by dedicating a street and a school to him.

Death
On 5 March 1935 Schemm was seriously injured in an aircraft crash. Although Hitler personally ordered noted surgeon Professor Ferdinand Sauerbruch to fly to Bayreuth, Schemm succumbed to his injuries that same day before the professor's arrival. He was succeeded by his Deputy, Ludwig Ruckdeschel, as Acting Gauleiter until Fritz Wächtler was appointed the permanent replacement on 5 December. He was given a lavish state funeral, attended by Hitler and most Party and State dignitaries. One observer noted:

[It] was the biggest Bayreuth had ever seen and far more ostentatious than Richard Wagner's. When all the guests had taken their places, for the funeral ceremony, Hitler arrived unexpectedly, and walked silently between the ranks of the raised arms. ... Hess delivered the main funeral oration, followed by Goebbels, Frick, Frank, Rosenberg, Himmler and many others. The ceremony concluded with the funeral march from the Twilight of the Gods.

The Nazis posthumously honored Schemm as a publicist and educator by naming multiple schools, streets, and halls after him.

Works 
 Der rote Krieg. Mutter oder Genossin, 1931
 Gott, Rasse und Kultur, 1933
 Unsere Religion heisst Christus, unsere Politik heisst Deutschland!, 1933

References

External links
 
 

1891 births
1935 deaths
Christian fascists
Gauleiters
German Army personnel of World War I
German newspaper editors
German Protestants
German schoolteachers
Members of the Academy for German Law
Members of the Landtag of Bavaria
Members of the Reichstag of the Weimar Republic
Members of the Reichstag of Nazi Germany
Militant League for German Culture members
Ministers of the Bavaria State Government
National Socialist Freedom Movement politicians
Nazi Party officials
Nazi Party politicians
Nazi propagandists
People from Bayreuth
People from the Kingdom of Bavaria
20th-century Freikorps personnel
20th-century German newspaper publishers (people)
Victims of aviation accidents or incidents in Germany
Victims of aviation accidents or incidents in 1935